Reinøya is an island in the municipality of Vardø in Troms og Finnmark, Norway. It is located west of Hornøya. Reinøya has a rich birdlife.

Important Bird Area
The island is included in the Varangerfjord Important Bird Area (IBA), designated as such by BirdLife International for its support of large numbers of waterbirds, seabirds and waders, either breeding or overwintering.

References

Vardø
Islands of Troms og Finnmark
Important Bird Areas of Norway
Important Bird Areas of Arctic islands